Valdir is a given name, most commonly used in Brazil. It may refer to:

 Valdir Azevedo (1923–1980), Brazilian conductor
 Valdir (footballer, born 1937), Brazilian footballer
 Valdir (footballer, born 1943), Brazilian football defender
 Valdir (footballer, born 1998), Brazilian footballer
 Valdir Benedito (born 1965), Brazilian footballer
 Valdir Bigode (born 1972), Brazilian former footballer 
 Valdir Espinosa (1947–2020), Brazilian football manager
 Valdir de Moraes (1931–2020), Brazilian football player and manager
 Valdir Lermen, Cyclist
 Valdir Pereira (1928–2001), Brazilian footballer
 Valdir Peres (1951–2017), Brazilian footballer

See also 
 all articles starting with "Valdir"
 Waldir